Mo Wanlan (born 4 January 1974) is a Chinese former swimmer who competed in the 1988 Summer Olympics.

References

1974 births
Living people
Chinese female butterfly swimmers
Olympic swimmers of China
Swimmers at the 1988 Summer Olympics
Place of birth missing (living people)